Bromoacetic acid is the chemical compound with the formula CH2BrCO2H.  This colorless solid is a relatively strong alkylating agent.  Bromoacetic acid and its esters are widely used building blocks in organic synthesis, for example, in pharmaceutical chemistry.

The compound is prepared by bromination of acetic acid, such as by a Hell–Volhard–Zelinsky reaction or using other reagents.

 CH3CO2H  +  Br2  →  CH2BrCO2H  +  HBr

See also 
 Acetic acid
 Chloroacetic acid
 Ethyl bromoacetate

References

External links 
 The microwave spectrum of bromoacetic acid
 Entry at chemicalland21.com

Alkylating agents
Acetic acids
Organobromides